is a passenger railway station in the city of Funabashi, Chiba, Japan, operated by East Japan Railway Company (JR East).

Lines
Funabashihōten Station is served by the orbital Musashino Line between Fuchūhommachi and Nishi-Funabashi, with some trains continuing to Tokyo via the Keiyō Line. It is located 68.9 kilometers from Fuchūhommachi Station.

Station layout
The station consists of an island platform serving two tracks. The platforms are located in a cutting below street level, with the station building above. The station is staffed.

Platforms

History
The station opened on 2 October 1978.

Passenger statistics
In fiscal 2019, the station was used by an average of 18,815 passengers daily (boarding passengers only).

Surrounding area
 Nakayama Racecourse
 Chiba Ichikawa Higashi High School
 Chiba Funabashi-Hōten High School
 Matsugane Stable

Bus routes
AEON MALL Shuttle Bus
For AEON MALL FUNABASHI
Keisei Bus Fighters Town Line and Keisei Bus System Kashiwai Line
For Nishi-Funabashi Station and Ichikawa Office
Chiba Rainbow Bus Shiroi Line
For Nishi-Funabashi Station and Shiroi Station

See also
 List of railway stations in Japan

References

External links

 Funabashihōten Station information (JR East) 

Railway stations in Japan opened in 1978
Stations of East Japan Railway Company
Railway stations in Chiba Prefecture
Funabashi
Musashino Line